Kim Yong-chol (born 29 March 1972) is a North Korean weightlifter. He competed in the men's bantamweight event at the 1992 Summer Olympics.

References

1972 births
Living people
North Korean male weightlifters
Olympic weightlifters of North Korea
Weightlifters at the 1992 Summer Olympics
Place of birth missing (living people)
20th-century North Korean people